Anthony Lwanga (born 20 March 1972) is a Kenyan footballer. He played in twelve matches for the Kenya national football team from 1992 to 1996. He was also named in Kenya's squad for the 1992 African Cup of Nations tournament.

References

1972 births
Living people
Kenyan footballers
Kenya international footballers
1992 African Cup of Nations players
Place of birth missing (living people)
Association football midfielders